The  Joseph Perkins House is a historic house in Methuen, Massachusetts.  From its external appearance, it is a Greek Revival 1.5-story wood-frame house, which appears to have been built around 1840; however, it has also been assigned construction dates as early as 1752 by local historians.  It exhibits Greek Revival features, with corner pilasters, a deep cornice, and a center delighted doorway framed by an entablature supported by pilastered.  It is named for a farmer who owned the property in the 19th century.

The property was listed on the National Register of Historic Places in 1984.

See also
 National Register of Historic Places listings in Methuen, Massachusetts
 National Register of Historic Places listings in Essex County, Massachusetts

References

Houses in Methuen, Massachusetts
Houses completed in 1840
National Register of Historic Places in Methuen, Massachusetts
Houses on the National Register of Historic Places in Essex County, Massachusetts
Greek Revival architecture in Massachusetts